Adel Al-Hammadi (Arabic:عادل الحمادي) (born 7 December 1991) is an Emirati footballer who plays as a left back .

External links

References

Emirati footballers
1991 births
Living people
Al Ahli Club (Dubai) players
Ajman Club players
Dibba FC players
Al-Ittihad Kalba SC players
Place of birth missing (living people)
UAE Pro League players
Association football defenders